Genome, formerly known as the Canadian Journal of Genetics and Cytology (1959–1986), is a monthly peer-reviewed scientific journal that published since 1959 by NRC Research Press. Genome prints articles in the fields of genetics and genomics, including cytogenetics, molecular and evolutionary genetics, population genetics, and developmental genetics. Genome is affiliated with the Canadian Society for Molecular Biosciences, and is co-edited by Melania Cristescu of McGill University and Lewis Lukens of University of Guelph.

References

External links 
 

Monthly journals
Genetics journals
Canadian Science Publishing academic journals
Multilingual journals
Publications established in 1959
Genomics journals
Academic journals associated with learned and professional societies of Canada